Principality of Serbia was the official name of Serbia from 1815 to 1882.

Principality of Serbia may also refer to:

 Principality of Serbia (early medieval), early medieval Serbian principality, during the 8th to 10th centuries
 Grand Principality of Serbia, medieval Serbian principality, from the 11th to the beginning of the 13th century
 Principality of Serbia (late medieval), late medieval Serbian principality, also known as Moravian Serbia (1371–1402)

See also
 Serbia (disambiguation)
 Kingdom of Serbia (disambiguation)
 Serbian Kingdom (disambiguation)
 Republic of Serbia (disambiguation)